Sabalan Rural District is in Sabalan District of Sareyn County, Ardabil province, Iran. At the census of 2006, its constituent villages were in Sareyn District of Ardabil County before the establishment the district as a county, with a population of 4,875 in 1,084 households. There were 1,900 inhabitants in 565 households at the following census of 2011, by which time Sabalan District was formed in the new county of Sareyn. At the most recent census of 2016, the population of the rural district was 1,798 in 560 households. The largest of its five villages was Irdemousa, with 816 people.

References 

Sareyn County

Rural Districts of Ardabil Province

Populated places in Ardabil Province

Populated places in Sareyn County

fa:دهستان ارجستان